The 2003 National Soccer League Grand Final was held on 1 June 2003 between Perth Glory and Olympic Sharks at Subiaco Oval. Perth Glory had gained home-ground advantage as they topped the Championship Playoff, with Olympic Sharks finishing second. Perth won the match 2–0, with goals from Jamie Harnwell and Damian Mori sealing their first National Soccer League championship. Simon Colosimo won the Joe Marston Medal.

Route to the Final

League Standings

Championship Playoff

Match

Details

References 

2003 in Australian soccer
NSL Grand Finals
Soccer in Perth, Western Australia
Perth Glory FC matches
Sydney Olympic FC